Lady Louise Alice Elizabeth Mary Mountbatten-Windsor (born 8 November 2003) is the elder child and only daughter of Prince Edward, Duke of Edinburgh, and Sophie, Duchess of Edinburgh. She is a granddaughter of Queen Elizabeth II and Prince Philip, Duke of Edinburgh. A niece of King Charles III, Lady Louise Windsor is 15th in the line of succession to the British throne .

Birth and baptism
Lady Louise Mountbatten-Windsor was born prematurely on 8 November 2003 at 23:32 GMT at Frimley Park Hospital in Frimley, Surrey, after her mother, Sophie, who was then Countess of Wessex was rushed there by ambulance from their home at Bagshot Park, Surrey. Louise's father, Prince Edward, who was then Earl of Wessex, was not present for the birth because it occurred suddenly and while he was on an official visit to Mauritius. Louise was delivered by emergency Caesarean section due to placental abruption, which caused severe blood loss to both child and mother. Louise was transferred to a neo-natal unit in St George's Hospital, Tooting, London, as a precaution. Meanwhile, her mother remained at Frimley Park until she was well enough to be discharged, on 23 November 2003. Her name, Louise Alice Elizabeth Mary, was announced on 27 November.

She was baptised in the Private Chapel of Windsor Castle on 24 April 2004 by David Conner, the Dean of Windsor; her godparents were Lady Sarah Chatto, Lord Ivar Mountbatten, Lady Alexandra Etherington, Francesca Schwarzenbach and Rupert Elliott. Louise was the last child to wear the original royal christening gown.

Born with esotropia, Louise underwent an operation in 2006 in an unsuccessful attempt to correct the problem. She had further treatment in late 2013 that corrected her eyes.

Education
Louise attended St George's School, Windsor Castle before moving to St Mary's School Ascot in 2017 from Year 9. She chose English, history, politics and drama as her A-Level subjects. While attending school, she took part in The Duke of Edinburgh's Award. Lady Louise started studying English at the University of St Andrews in September 2022. In August 2022, it was reported that she had been working at a garden centre over the summer.

Official appearances

In 2011, aged 7, Louise was a bridesmaid at the wedding of Prince William and Catherine Middleton.

In April 2015, Louise and her brother James participated in their first overseas engagement. They accompanied their parents on a trip to South Africa.

In August 2018, Louise accompanied her mother, patron of UK Sail Training, to Haslar Marina in Portsmouth Harbour to meet a group of young girls working towards earning their qualification on an entry-level course of the Royal Yachting Association. In the same month, mother and daughter attended the final of the Hockey Women's World Cup in London. The Countess has a great interest in the sport and is the patron of England Hockey. At the age of 14, Louise was a special attendant at the wedding of Princess Eugenie and Jack Brooksbank. To celebrate Louise's 15th birthday in November 2018, mother and daughter made a cameo appearance on Strictly Come Dancing as they watched the popular BBC television show from the audience. Louise accompanied the Countess in attending the International Horse Show at Olympia, London, in December 2018.

In September 2020, Louise participated in the Great British Beach Clean with her family at Southsea Beach, in support of the Marine Conservation Society.

Following the death of her grandfather Prince Philip, Louise accompanied her parents and uncle Prince Andrew to a church service at Royal Chapel of All Saints on 11 April 2021, and met members of the Windsor Estate staff to share memories and condolences. She also attended his funeral on 17 April 2021.

In March 2022 she attended the memorial service for Prince Philip, Duke of Edinburgh. In June 2022 she attended Trooping the Colour, where she also joined her family on the balcony, the Platinum Jubilee National Service of Thanksgiving and the Platinum Party at the Palace.

Following the death of Queen Elizabeth II on 8 September 2022, Lady Louise stood vigil for 15 minutes over her grandmother's coffin at Westminster Hall together with the other grandchildren of the late Queen on 17 September. On 19 September, she joined other family members at the state funeral.

Personal interests
Louise is a member of Girlguiding, of which her grandmother was patron and her mother is president. Her mother was a Brownie and a Guide when she was a child.

She was taught to ride at a young age, and joined her father on horseback as part of the Queen's 90th birthday celebrations in Windsor in 2016. She has taken up carriage driving, a sport popularised in Britain by her grandfather, Prince Philip. In May 2017, she was responsible for leading the carriages of the Champagne Laurent-Perrier Meet of the British Driving Society at the Royal Windsor Horse Show. In May 2019, Louise took part in the Private Driving Singles carriage drive at the Royal Windsor Horse Show and achieved third place. She inherited her grandfather's driving ponies and carriage in April 2021. In 2022, she drove one of his carriages in front of the Queen at the Royal Windsor Horse Show.

Titles, styles, and honours

Titles and styles

She is styled as "Lady Louise Mountbatten-Windsor", although at the time of her birth the palace also used the style "Lady Louise Windsor" in some of its announcements. Letters patent issued in 1917 assign a princely status and the style of Royal Highness to all children of a monarch's sons. However, when her parents married, Elizabeth II, via a Buckingham Palace press release, announced that their children would be styled as the children of an earl, rather than as prince or princess. In 2020, her mother stated that Louise retained her royal title and style and could make a choice on whether to use it from the age of 18.

Honours
In June 2008, to recognise a visit by Louise's father to the Canadian province of Manitoba, the Lieutenant Governor of Manitoba renamed a lake in the north of the province after her. Her younger brother, James, was also honoured with a different lake in the province.

References

External links

 

2003 births
21st-century English people
21st-century English women
Living people
British Anglicans
British princesses
Daughters of British earls
English people of Danish descent
English people of German descent
English people of Greek descent
English people of Russian descent
English people of Scottish descent
Louise
Louise Windsor, Lady
People educated at St George's School, Windsor Castle
People from Bagshot
People from Frimley
Louise Windsor, Lady
Daughters of British dukes